Martha Saxton is an American professor of history and women's and gender studies at Amherst College who has authored several prominent historical biographies.

Life
She graduated from Columbia University, and University of Chicago.
She taught at Amherst College, and  Hampshire County Jail and House of Correction.

In 2003, she wrote Being Good: Women's Moral Values in Early America. The TV film The Jayne Mansfield Story featuring Loni Anderson and Arnold Schwarzenegger was based on her book Jayne Mansfield and the American fifties.

She also published findings of a classroom experiment on Wikipedia's inclusion of women in historical articles. She is a recipient of the PEN New England Award.

Publications

Books

The Widow Washington: The Life of Mary Washington (Farrar, Straus and Giroux, 2019). , 
Being Good: Women's Moral Values in Early America (Hill and Wang, 2003). , 
Interpretations of American History (seventh edition) with Frank Couvares (previously edited by Gerald Grob and George Billias), Free Press, Spring 2000.
Louisa May Alcott: A Modern Biography (Houghton Mifflin, 1977) (Avon, 1978; Farrar Straus & Giroux, 1995). , 
Jayne Mansfield and the American Fifties (Houghton Mifflin, 1976) (Bantam, 1976). ,

Essays, reviews, and other

"Lives of Missouri Slave Women: A Critique of true Womanhood," in eds. Manisha Sinha and Penny Von Eschen, Contested Democracy: Freedom, Race and Power in American History, Columbia U. Press, 2007.
"Curing Gender Amnesia," Women's Review of Books 24.1 (Jan Feb 2007): 24.
"Masquerade: the Life and Times of Deborah Sampson, Continental Soldier," by Alfred Young, in The William and Mary Quarterly, forthcoming.
"River Gods-and Goddesses. Women's Review of Books 21.9 (June 2004): 10.
"Neither Lady Nor Slave," The S.C. Historical Magazinheae, October 2004.
"La Formazione degli Stati Uniti," Journal of American History, February, 2004.
"Sexism and the City," Journal of Urban History, January, 2003.
"Examining our Revolutionary Baggage," Reviews in American History, December, 2000
"The Moral Minority, Prescriptive Literature in Early St. Louis," Gateway-Heritage, The Quarterly Magazine of the Missouri Historical Society (Fall 2000): 18–31.
"Women Without Rights," in Not for Ourselves Alone, ed. by Geoffrey C. Ward and Ken Burns (New York: A. A. Knopf, Inc., 1999), 52–57.
"Puritan Women: The Seeds of a Critical Tradition," History Today, 44.10 (Sept./Oct. 1994): 28–33.
"Civil War Nurses," in The Face of Mercy, A Photographic History of Medicine at War, ed. by Matthew Naythons, and William Styron (San Francisco: Epicenter, 1993).

Awards and honors

Whiting Travel Fellowship, 2012
Cullman Fellow, New York Public Library, 2007–2008
Doshisha Lecturer, Doshisha University, Kyoto, Japan (2006)
Miner D. Crary Award, Amherst College (2000-2001)
Bunting Fellow, Radcliffe College (1995-1996)
Mellon Fellow, Society of Fellows in the Humanities, Columbia (1988-1990)
Lane Cooper Award, Columbia (1987-1988)
Mary Ellen Shimke Award, Wellesley College (1986-1987)
Presidential Fellow, Columbia (1985–88)
Boston Globe Annual Award for Louisa May Alcott (1977)

Scholarly and professional activities

Member, Authors' Guild
Member, PEN, Secretary of PEN Executive Board, 1986-1989
Member, PEN/Martha Albrand Award Committee, 1992
Member, Willie Lee Rose Prize Committee, 1996 (Southern Association for Women's Historians)
Member, Julia Spruill Prize Committee, 1999 (Southern Association for Women's Historians)
Member, Louis Pelzer Memorial Award Committee, AHA, 2005-6
Co-founder and co-editor of The Journal of the History of Childhood and Youth, 2006

References

External links
Macmillan
Amherst College
University of Massachusetts

Amherst College
American social scientists
21st-century American historians
Living people
American women historians
21st-century American women writers
Year of birth missing (living people)